Assan may refer to:
Asan Barrage, India
Asan (people), an extinct ethnic group of Russia
Assan language, an extinct language once spoken by those people
Assan (surname), a family name

See also
Assam, where Assan may be a misspelling or a mispronunciation of Assam
Assane 

Language and nationality disambiguation pages